Rhododendron coeloneurum (粗脉杜鹃) is a rhododendron species native to northern and southeastern Guizhou, southern Sichuan, and northeastern Yunnan, China, where it grows at altitudes of . The flowers are pink to purplish, with purple spots.

References
 Diels, Bot. Jahrb. Syst. 29: 513. 1900.

coeloneurum